The 1997 XXXIII FIBA International Christmas Tournament "Trofeo Raimundo Saporta-Memorial Fernando Martín" was the 33nd edition of the FIBA International Christmas Tournament. It took place at Palacio de Deportes de la Comunidad de Madrid, Madrid, Spain, on 24, 25 and 26 December 1997 with the participations of Real Madrid Teka (champions of the 1996–97 FIBA EuroCup), Brazil, Italy and New Zealand.

League stage

Day 1, December 24, 1997

|}

Day 2, December 25, 1997

|}

Day 3, December 26, 1997

|}

Final standings

References

1997–98 in European basketball
1997–98 in Italian basketball
1997–98 in Spanish basketball